Guanine nucleotide-binding protein G(k) subunit alpha is a protein that in humans is encoded by the GNAI3 gene.

Interactions 

GNAI3 has been shown to interact with:

 RGS10 
 RGS12, 
 RGS14, 
 RGS16, 
 RGS18, 
 RGS19, 
 RGS5,
 RIC8A,  and
 S1PR1.

See also 
 Gi alpha subunit

References

Further reading